Sean Murray may refer to:

 Sean Murray (field hockey) (born 1997), Lisnagarvey player and senior Ireland international
 Sean Murray (footballer, born 1993), Dundalk FC player and Irish youth international
 Sean Murray (Gaelic footballer), Dublin player
 Sean Murray (actor) (born 1977), notable for his role on the TV show NCIS
 Sean Murray (politician) (1898–1961), Irish communist politician
 Sean Murray (Irish republican), Irish republican from Belfast, Northern Ireland
 Sean Murray (composer) (born 1965), notable for his work in the Call of Duty series
 Sean Murray, co-founder and director of Hello Games
 Shaun Murray (born 1976), American wakeboarder
 Shaun Murray (footballer) (born 1970), former professional footballer